Johan D. van der Vyver is the I.T. Cohen Professor of International Law and Human Rights at Emory University School of Law in Atlanta, Georgia.

Van der Vyver attended Potchefstroom University for Christian Higher Education, where he was classmates with F.W. de Klerk. He received a Doctor Legum, from University of Pretoria in 1974 and a Diploma of the International and Comparative Law of Human Rights of the International Institute of Human Rights in Strasbourg, France in 1986.  He also has two honorary Doctor Legum degrees from the University of Zululand and the Potchefstroom University.

He was heavily involved in the promotion of human rights in South Africa, advocating for an end to apartheid, while a professor at the University of the Witwatersrand, Johannesburg.

He served as a fellow in the Human Rights Program at the Carter Center from 1995 to March 1998 before becoming a professor of law at Emory University School of Law.

He is a senior fellow at Emory's Center for the Study of Law and Religion.

He is the author of several law review articles and supplements, including Morality, Human Rights, and Foundation of the Law, International Criminal Court and the Concept of Mens Rea in International Criminal Law.

In October 2006, van der Vyver addressed the U.S. State Department on whether to make the Declaration on the Elimination of All Forms of Intolerance and of Discrimination Based on Religion or Belief a convention. He argued that the government should push for "true" international consensus, rather than a "lukewarm" convention on religious tolerance.

References

External links
https://web.archive.org/web/20090925200526/http://cslr.law.emory.edu/people/person/name/van-der-vyver/

University of Pretoria alumni
Living people
Emory University faculty
1934 births
20th-century South African lawyers